Trevor Sebastian Cobb (born November 20, 1970) is an American former professional football player who was a running back for the Chicago Bears of the National Football League (NFL).  He played college football for the Rice Owls football, and earned All-American honors.

Early years
Cobb was born in Houston, Texas.  He graduated from J. Frank Dobie High School in Houston, Texas, where he played high school football for the Dobie Longhorns.

College career
Cobb received an athletic scholarship to attend Rice University in Houston, and played for the Owls teams from 1989 to 1993.  As a junior in 1991, he amassed 1,692 yards rushing and 14 touchdowns, won the Doak Walker Award as the nation's best running back, and was recognized as a consensus first-team All-American.  In his four college seasons, he rushed for 4,948 yards and 38 touchdowns.

Professional career
Unselected in the 1993 NFL Draft, he signed with the Chicago Bears as an undrafted free agent.

References

External links 
 

1970 births
Living people
All-American college football players
American football running backs
Chicago Bears players
Players of American football from Houston
Rice Owls football players